Shōkichi, Shokichi or Shoukichi (written: , ,) is a masculine Japanese given name. Notable people with the name include:

, Japanese sculptor
, Japanese mathematician
, Japanese rock musician and politician
, Japanese rower
, Japanese judoka
, Japanese football player
, Japanese film promoter and producer

Japanese masculine given names